Vanessa Bauche ( born Alma Vanessa Bauche Chavira; February 18, 1973) is a Mexican television, theatre and film actress.

Early life

Bauche was born Alma Vanessa Bauche Chavira, named after actress Vanessa Redgrave. Her father was a Romani who married her mother, a woman who aspired to be a dancer and singer. At the time of the marriage, her mother was sixteen years old and her father was a junior in high school. The couple divorced when Bauche was seven years old. After the divorce, she and her brother, Tito, spent three years traveling with their father. Eventually, she and her brother settled down with their mother in Mexico City.

Career
She received her starring role in a film as a drug-addicted prostitute in El Patrullero (Highway Patrolman) (1991). After starring in a number of telenovelas she played a lead role in the international success Amores Perros (2000). 

While Bauche has found success in both film and television, she also maintains a steady career in theater.

Filmography

Awards and nominations
Ariel Award
1995: Nominated, "Best Supporting Actress" - Hasta morir
1999: Won, "Best Actress in a Minor Role" - Un embrujo
2002: Won, "Best Supporting Actress" - De la calle
2005: Nominated, "Best Actress" - Digna: Hasta el último aliento

Lleida Latin-American Film Festival
2006: Won, "Best Actress" - Al Otro Lado and Las vueltas del citrillo

Western Heritage Awards
2006: Won, "Outstanding Theatrical Motion Picture" - The Three Burials of Melquiades Estrada

References

External links

1973 births
20th-century Mexican actresses
21st-century Mexican actresses
Mexican film actresses
Mexican telenovela actresses
Living people